United States gubernatorial elections are scheduled to be held on November 3, 2026, in 36 states and three territories. The previous gubernatorial elections for this group of states took place in 2022, except in New Hampshire and Vermont, where governors serve two-year terms and will elect their governors in 2024.

Race summary

States

Territories and federal district

Alabama

Governor Kay Ivey was re-elected in 2022 with 67.4% of the vote. She will be term-limited by the Constitution of Alabama in 2026 and cannot seek re-election to a third consecutive term.

Alaska

Governor Mike Dunleavy was re-elected in 2022 with 50.3% of the vote. He will be term-limited by the Constitution of Alaska in 2026 and cannot seek re-election to a third consecutive term.

Arizona

Governor Katie Hobbs was elected in 2022 with 50.3% of the vote. She is eligible to run for re-election but has not yet stated if she will do so.

Arkansas

Governor Sarah Huckabee Sanders was elected in 2022 with 63.1% of the vote. She is eligible to run for re-election but has not yet stated if she will do so.

California

Governor Gavin Newsom was re-elected in 2022 with 59.29% of the vote. He will be term-limited by the California Constitution in 2026 and cannot seek re-election to a third term.

Lieutenant Governor Eleni Kounalakis, Treasurer Fiona Ma, and former Controller Betty Yee have all publicly expressed an interest in running.

Colorado

Governor Jared Polis was re-elected in 2022 with 58.5% of the vote. He will be term-limited by the Colorado Constitution in 2026 and cannot seek re-election to a third consecutive term.

Connecticut

Governor Ned Lamont was re-elected in 2022 with 55.9% of the vote. Because Connecticut does not have gubernatorial term limits in its Constitution, he is eligible to run for re-election to a third term. However, Lamont has suggested, though not outright confirmed, that he will be retiring.

Florida

Governor Ron DeSantis was re-elected in 2022 with 59.4% of the vote. He will be term-limited by the Florida Constitution in 2026 and cannot seek re-election to a third consecutive term.

Georgia

Governor Brian Kemp was re-elected in 2022 with 53.4% of the vote. He will be term-limited by the Georgia Constitution in 2026 and cannot seek re-election to a third consecutive term.

Hawaii

Governor Josh Green was elected in 2022 with 63.2% of the vote. He is eligible to run for re-election but has not yet stated if he will do so.

Idaho
Governor Brad Little was re-elected in 2022 with 60.5% of the vote. He is eligible to run for re-election to a third term, but has not yet stated whether he will do so.

Illinois

Governor J. B. Pritzker was re-elected in 2022 with 54.9% of the vote. He is eligible to run for re-election to a third term, but has not yet stated whether he will do so.

Iowa

Governor Kim Reynolds was re-elected in 2022 with 58.1% of the vote. She is eligible to run for re-election to a third term, but has not yet stated whether she will do so.

Kansas

Governor Laura Kelly was re-elected in 2022 with 49.5% of the vote. She will be term limited  by the Kansas Constitution and cannot seek re-election to a third consecutive term.

Maine

Governor Janet Mills was re-elected in 2022 with 55.4% of the vote. She will be term limited  by the Maine Constitution and cannot seek re-election to a third consecutive term.

Maryland 

Governor Wes Moore was elected in 2022 with 64.5% of the vote. He is eligible to run for re-election, but has not yet stated if he will do so.

Andy Ellis, former Maryland and Baltimore City Green Party Co-Chair, has established a campaign finance committee and is exploring a run as a Green Party Candidate.

Massachusetts
Governor Maura Healey was elected in 2022 with 63.8% of the vote. Healey is eligible to run for re-election but has not yet stated if she will do so.

Michigan

Governor Gretchen Whitmer was re-elected in 2022 with 54.5% of the vote. She will be term-limited by the Michigan Constitution in 2026 and cannot seek re-election to a third term.

Minnesota

Governor Tim Walz was re-elected in 2022 with 52.3% of the vote. He is eligible to run for re-election to a third term but has not yet stated whether he will do so.

Nebraska
Governor Jim Pillen was elected in 2022 with 59.7% of the vote. He is eligible to run for re-election, but has not yet stated if he will do so.

Nevada
Governor Joe Lombardo was elected in 2022 with 48.8% of the vote. He is eligible to run for re-election, but has not yet stated if he will do so. Potential candidates include term-limted Attorney General Aaron D. Ford, and term-limted State Treasurer Zach Conine.

New Hampshire 
The incumbent governor will be determined in 2024, as New Hampshire elects their governors in a seven-year cycle.

New Mexico
Governor Michelle Lujan Grisham was re-elected in 2022 with 52.0% of the vote. She will be term-limited by the New Mexico Constitution in 2026 and cannot seek re-election to a third consecutive term.

New York

Governor Kathy Hochul took office in 2021 upon the resignation of Andrew Cuomo and was elected to a full term in 2022 with 53.2% of the vote. She is eligible to run for re-election to a second full term but has not yet stated if she will do so.

Ohio

Governor Mike DeWine was re-elected in 2022 with 62.8% of the vote. He will be term-limited by the Ohio Constitution in 2026 and cannot seek re-election to a third consecutive term.

Oklahoma

Governor Kevin Stitt was re-elected in 2022 with 55.4% of the vote. He will be term-limited by the Oklahoma Constitution in 2026 and cannot seek re-election to a third term.

Oregon 

Governor Tina Kotek was elected in 2022 with 47% of the vote. She is eligible to run for re-election, but has not yet stated if she will do so.

Pennsylvania 

Governor Josh Shapiro was elected in 2022 with 56.5% of the vote. He is eligible to run for re-election, but has not yet stated if he will do so.

Rhode Island

Governor Dan McKee took office in 2021 upon the resignation of Gina Raimondo and was elected to a full term in 2022 with 58.1% of the vote. Because McKee served less than two years of Raimondo's term, he is eligible to run for re-election to a second consecutive full term. However, he has not yet stated if he will do so.

South Carolina

Governor Henry McMaster was re-elected in 2022 with 58.1% of the vote. He will be term-limited by the South Carolina Constitution in 2026 and cannot seek re-election to a third consecutive term.

South Dakota 

Governor Kristi Noem was re-elected in 2022 with 62% of the vote. She will be term-limited by the South Dakota Constitution in 2026 and cannot seek re-election to a third consecutive term.

Tennessee

Governor Bill Lee was re-elected in 2022 with 64.9% of the vote. He is term-limited by the Tennessee Constitution in 2026 and cannot seek re-election to a third consecutive term.

Texas 

Governor Greg Abbott was re-elected in 2022 with 54.8% of the vote. He is eligible to run for re-election to a fourth term, but has not yet stated whether he will do so.

Vermont 
The incumbent Governor of Vermont will be determined in 2024, as Vermont elects governors on a two-year cycle.

Wisconsin

Governor Tony Evers was re-elected in 2022 with 51.2% of the vote. He is eligible to run for re-election to a third term, but has not yet stated whether he will do so.

Wyoming 

Governor Mark Gordon was re-elected in 2022 with 78.7% of the vote. He will be term limited by the Wyoming Constitution in 2026 and cannot seek re-election for a third consecutive term.

Territories and federal district

District of Columbia 
Mayor Muriel Bowser was re-elected in 2022 with 74.6% of the vote. She is eligible to run for re-election to a fourth term, but has not yet stated whether she will do so.

Guam 
Governor Lou Leon Guerrero was re-elected in 2022 with 55.5% of the vote. She will be term limited in 2026 and cannot seek re-election for a third consecutive term.

Northern Mariana Islands 
Governor Arnold Palacios was re-elected in 2022 with 54.1% of the vote. He is eligible to run for re-election to a second term, but has not yet stated whether he will do so.

U.S. Virgin Islands 
Governor Albert Bryan was re-elected in 2022 with 56.1% of the vote. He will be term limited in 2026 and cannot seek re-election for a third consecutive term.

Notes

References 

 
November 2026 events in the United States